An election to Hampshire County Council took place on 2 May 2013 as part of the 2013 United Kingdom local elections. 78 councillors were elected from 75 electoral divisions, which returned either one or two county councillors each by first-past-the-post voting for a four-year term of office. The electoral divisions were the same as those of the previous election in 2009. No elections were held in Portsmouth and Southampton, which are unitary authorities outside the area covered by the County Council. The election saw the Conservative Party retain overall control of the council, with a reduced majority of five councillors.

All locally registered electors (British, Irish, Commonwealth and European Union citizens) who were aged 18 or over on Thursday 2 May 2013 were entitled to vote in the local elections. Those who were temporarily away from their ordinary address (for example, away working, on holiday, in student accommodation or in hospital) were also entitled to vote in the local elections, although those who had moved abroad and registered as overseas electors cannot vote in the local elections. It is possible to register to vote at more than one address (such as a university student who had a term-time address and lives at home during holidays) at the discretion of the local Electoral Register Office, but it remains an offence to vote more than once in the same local government election.

Summary
The elections saw the Conservative Party retain overall control of the council, though with their majority reduced from 24 seats to five. The largest opposition party continued to be the Liberal Democrats, despite a net loss of seven seats.  Having been reduced to just one seat in the previous election, the Labour Party gained three more seats including two which had been lost in 2009. The election saw an electoral breakthrough by the UK Independence Party, who won their first seats on the council and became the third-largest party.

The local Community Campaign in Hart successfully defended its councillor's seat in Church Crookham and Ewshot, which was the only seat it fought. An independent candidate gained a seat in Lymington from the Conservatives. Alan Weeks, the sole Green Party incumbent who had defected from the Liberal Democrats, lost his Totton North seat to UKIP.

Candidates
The Conservatives and Labour both obtained local nominations for all divisions, while UKIP had no candidates in six divisions and the Liberal Democrats had no candidate in one. The Green Party fielded 30 candidates, six short of half of the council divisions. The next highest total share of votes was won by the six independent candidates. None of the other parties, local or national achieved more than 0.71% of the vote.

Results

|}

Results by electoral division
Hampshire County Council is divided into 11 districts, which are split further into electoral divisions.

Basingstoke and Deane (10 seats)

East Hampshire (7 seats)

Eastleigh (7 seats)

Fareham (7 seats)

Gosport (5 seats)

Hart (5 seats)

Havant (7 seats)

New Forest (11 seats)

Rushmoor (5 seats)

Test Valley (7 seats)

Winchester (7 seats)

References

External links
Hampshire County Council

2013 English local elections
2013
2010s in Hampshire